Polyzosteria cuprea is a species of bush cockroach found in south western Australia. It is a diurnal species and its typical habitat is arid regions and eucalyptus woodland.

Description
Polyzosteria cuprea is a wingless, dorsally-flattened, charcoal-grey insect. There is a large, cream-coloured patch at the front of the tergum (dorsal plate) of the prothorax, smaller cream markings on the sides of the next two terga, and cream bands on the legs.

References

Cockroaches
Insects of Australia
Insects described in 1863